Scariot is a Norwegian progressive metal band founded by Daniel Olaisen in 1997. The band has been through several lineup changes, and Olaisen is the only original member still remaining.

Their fourth and latest album, Momentum Shift, was released in Scandinavia in February and in Europe and North America in May 2007.

Discography 
 Deathforlorn (2000)
 Toungeless God (2001)
 Strange to Numbers (2003)
 Momentum Shift (2007)

Band members

Current lineup 
Daniel Olaisen – guitars
Øyvind Hægeland – vocals (also plays some lead guitar and bass)
Asgeir Mickelson – drums
Steve DiGiorgio – bass

Previous members 
Oddleif Stensland – vocals
Ronny Thorsen – vocals
Geir Solli – vocals
Bernt Fjellestad – vocals
Frank Ørland – guitars
Hugo Isaksen – guitars
Steffan Schultze – bass/vocals
Bjørnar Svendsen – bass
Anders Kobro – drums
Tor Atle Andersen – drums

External links 
kvltsite.com review of Momentum Shift

Norwegian progressive metal musical groups
Musical groups established in 1997
1997 establishments in Norway
Musical groups from Kristiansand